The Coptic Orthodox Diocese of Beheira is a diocese of the Coptic Church in the northwest of Egypt. It is headquartered in the metropolis of Damanhur, and is currently headed by Metropolitan Pachomius.

Jurisdiction 
The modern diocese comprises the governorates of Beheira, and Matrouh. These governorates encompass the ancient suffragan dioceses of: Buto, Naucratis, Mareotis, Paraetonium, and Apis.

History 
The history of the diocese is obscure before the 20th century, however, it is clear that during the medieval period the numerous episcopal sees that populated the North Coast of Egypt were consolidated into this single diocese, due to rampant depopulation and conversion. The first recorded mention of the Diocese of Beheira is a reference to its bishop Marcos I, who consecrated the Myron with Pope Benjamin II.

During the early 20th century, the diocese underwent two mergers with neighboring dioceses.

Merger with the Diocese of Monufia 
Following the death of Bishop Ioannes I of Monufia in 1894, the people of the diocese declined to have a new bishop consecrated for them; rather, they chose to have  Metropolitan Ioannes I of Beheira (later elected Pope John XIX), to be enthroned over their diocese. Thus, Ioannes I of Beheira also served as Ioannes II of Monufia, until his resignation from both dioceses in 1928 due to his election to the Patriarchate. This merger lasted from 1894 to 1928.

Merger with the Diocese of Gharbia 
Following the election of Pope John XIX, the see of Beheira remained vacant for two years. In 1930, following the death of Bishop Peter II of Gharbia, Pope John XIX decided to ordain new bishops to fill the three newly vacant sees. He chose to separate the diocese Monufia from the diocese Beheira, consecration for it a bishop by the name of Demetirus. He also decided to merge the Diocese of Gharbia with Beheira consecrating for them Bishop Tomas of Beheira and Gharbia. This merger lasted from 1930 to 1968.

Return to independence 
Following the death of Metropolitan Isaak in 1968, Pope Cyril VI consecrated Bishop Andraous for Gharbia in 1969. The see of Beheira remained vacant until Pope Shenouda III consecrated Bishop Pachomius (now a Metropolitan) in late 1971.

List of bishops 
 Marcos I (~14th c)
 Marcos II (-1887)
 Ioannes I (1887- 1928, elected Patriarch)
 Tomas (1930-1956)
 Isaak (1959-1968)
 Pachomius (1971–present)

References 

Coptic Orthodox Church
Oriental Orthodox dioceses
Coptic Orthodox Church in Africa
Matrouh Governorate
Beheira Governorate